Zig-Zag is a brand of rolling papers that originated in France. The Zig-Zag brand produces primarily hand-rolled tobacco related products such as cigarette rolling papers, cigarette tubes and rolling accessories.

History of Zig-Zag 
The company was founded in 1855 by Maurice and Jacques Braunstein. Based in Paris, in 1882 the company built the Papeterie de Gassicourt, a cigarette paper production plant near the town of Mantes-la-Jolie. In 1894 they invented the process of "interleaving" rolling papers. They called their papers Zig-Zag after the zigzag alternating packaging process. In 1900, Zig-Zag was awarded a gold medal at the Universal Exposition in Paris.

Success led to expansion in 1919 to a new mill in Thonon-les-Bains. During World War II, the company's original facility in Mantes-la-Jolie was destroyed and at war's end, all production was shifted to the Thonon factory.

With the death of Jacques Braunstein, in the 1950s Zig-Zag was sold to a partnership of the Group Bolloré and competitor JOB. In 2000, Zig-Zag became part of Republic Technologies of which Group Bolloré owns 19 percent.

Marketing

Captain Zig-Zag 
The zouave soldier portrayed on the front of Zig-Zag products is colloquially known as the "Zig-Zag man". The choice of a member of this French North African regiment as a Zig-Zag icon originates from a folk story about an incident in the battle of Sevastopol. When the soldier's clay pipe was destroyed by a bullet, he attempted to roll his tobacco using a piece of paper torn from a musket cartridge. 

In an advertising campaign in the 1960s, Zig-Zag published leaflets with the zouave facing the viewer (much like Uncle Sam) and the caption, "Captain Zig-Zag wants YOU!" The reason for using the rank of "captain" is unclear as the Zig-Zag man is portrayed in the fez and embroidered jacket of an ordinary zouave and is not an officer.

In popular culture 
One of the covers of Zig-Zag inspired the album cover for The Chronic by Dr. Dre. 
One of the concert posters promoting a show at The Avalon Ballroom featuring Big Brother and the Holding Company with Janis Joplin was done to look like a packet of Zig-Zags
In the poem The Shoelace by Charles Bukowski, Zig-Zag is mentioned: "...plenty of zigzag but no pot...."

See also
 List of rolling papers

References

External links 
 Official Website
 Official UK Website
 Group Bolloré company history
 

French companies established in 1879
Cigarette rolling papers
Tobacco companies of France
French brands
Manufacturing companies established in 1879